Liberty or Death is the 13th studio album by German heavy metal band Grave Digger. It was released on 15 January 2007 via Locomotive Records.

Track listing
All songs composed and arranged by Boltendahl/Becker/Schmidt and Katzenburg; all lyrics by Boltendahl.

Lyrical themes 
 Vocalist Chris Boltendahl was inspired with this album by the book named "Liberty Or Death" by the Cretean writer Nikos Kazantzakis, whose title is the English translation of Eleftheria i thanatos. The book directly inspired the title song about the Greek revolution on Crete, with lyrical references to the Greek national anthem.
 Two songs deal with Germany's treatment of the Jews in the Second World War and a further two more about more Ancient Jewish history. "Ocean of Blood" tells of Moses parting the Red Sea and "Massada" tells of the siege of Masada at the end of the First Jewish-Roman War. "March of the Innocent" is about the Holocaust and "Ship of Hope" tells of the "Voyage of the Damned" of the SS St. Louis. Boltendahl said that the number of songs on this subject was not intended, but that the stories were interesting on their own. 
"Highland Tears" deals with freedom in Scotland. "Forecourt to Hell" deals with the gladiators in the Roman Empire age. "The Terrible One" is about Ivan the Terrible. "Until the Last King Died" is about the French Revolution, "Shadowland" about the atrocities of the Ku Klux Klan in the USA and "Silent Revolution" deals with Mahatma Gandhi's non-violent struggle against the oppression of the Indian people.

Album line-up 
 Chris Boltendahl - vocals
 Manni Schmidt - guitars
 Jens Becker - bass
 Stefan Arnold - drums
 HP Katzenburg - keyboards

References

Grave Digger (band) albums
2007 albums
Locomotive Music albums